Who Cares a Lot? - The Greatest Hits is the first compilation album by American rock band Faith No More, released on November 24, 1998. The album is a greatest hits retrospective that spans most of the band's career, including songs from all of the band's studio albums released under Slash Records.

The first disc collects 15 singles from the band's Slash Records career in chronological order. It features the most recognized hits and promos. The second disc has a handful of unreleased songs, B-sides, demos, and live recordings, which were chosen by Slash rather than the band themselves. Some of the notable previously unreleased material includes "The World Is Yours" and "I Won't Forget You".

Release history
There were three different versions that were put out for this compilation. Between the versions, the title and covers were altered. The single disc edition was tagged "The Greatest Hits", while the dual disc was labelled "Greatest Hits".

The album art for the American release was the red question mark on black background, while the United Kingdom, European, Argentine, and Oceanian releases featured the Benny Hill art. The Oceanian double disc edition also had a "Limited Edition 2CD Set" sticker, as in other markets the bonus disc was not limited. In Europe, only a single disc edition was released. For this, the first five tracks off the second disc were simply added to the end of the compilation.

The album was originally called 'Who Cared a Lot?'. It had a different order of tracks and a different cover, but only saw release as a promo.

Track listing

Charts

Weekly charts

Year-end charts

Certifications

Footnotes

<li>All releases of this compilation contain the Slash Records version of "We Care a Lot" found on Introduce Yourself, rather than the one from the band's earlier independent We Care a Lot album. The album sleeves that describe the track as "Original Version" are misleading. This error is corrected somewhat on the band's following greatest hits release This Is It: The Best of Faith No More, which correctly labels the track as "We Care a Lot (Slash Version)"
<li>Live on October 6, 1997 at San Francisco
<li>^ Live on October 21, 1997 at the Horden Pavilion, Sydney, Australia recorded by MTV Australia

References

Faith No More albums
1998 greatest hits albums
Albums produced by Andy Wallace (producer)
Albums produced by Roli Mosimann
Slash Records compilation albums
Alternative metal compilation albums